Amos Steck (January 8, 1822 – November 17, 1908) was an American lawyer and politician.  He served as Postmaster in 1859, then mayor of Denver, Colorado from 1863 to 1864. He also was School Board president, and elected to the state legislature. He died in 1908 and is buried in Riverside Cemetery in Denver. Amos Steck Elementary School is named after him.

References

Bibliography

 

Mayors of Denver
1822 births
1908 deaths